Betchcott is a hamlet near the villages of Picklescott and Woolstaston in Shropshire, England.

It lies in the parish of Smethcott, in the northern foothills of the Long Mynd. The nearest town is Church Stretton. The hamlet is made up of three farms, Upper Farm, Middle Farm and Batchcott Hall Farm, as well as Batchcott Hall and several other cottages. 

Its name is derived from Old English bæce or bece, "brook", referring to a cottage by a brook.

See also
Listed buildings in Smethcott

References

External links

Villages in Shropshire
Shrewsbury and Atcham